Flora Chan Wai-shan (Traditional Chinese:陳慧珊, born May 30, 1970 in Hong Kong), is an American actress active primarily in Hong Kong television and film. Along with Maggie Cheung Ho-yee, Kenix Kwok, Jessica Hsuan, and Ada Choi, she is known as one of the Top 5 "Fa Dans" (term used for actresses with high popularity) of TVB from the mid-1990s to mid-2000s.

Biography
Chan was born in Hong Kong, whose father,Walter Chan, was a dance director of Rediffusion Television and mother,Cecilia Harrison, was daughter of a British merchant. Her family emigrated to Boston，United States when she was 5. As a child, she had hoped to become a dancer, but because of an injury when she was a teenager, she was forced to abandon her dreams as a professional dancer. She attended Boston College and earned a degree in communications before returning to Hong Kong in the early 1990s with her then-husband, Chung Wai Ming (鍾偉明). She and her first husband divorced in 2001. Chan married her manager Mike Chung Ka-hung (鍾家鴻) in 2006. The couple have one child.

Rather than getting her start from modelling or a beauty pageant, the Miss Hong Kong Pageant, (香港小姐競選) which provides actresses for HK's television station, TVB, Chan was a reporter for the TVB English Channel, TVB Pearl. In the mid-1990s, television director Teng Dak-Hei asked her to participate in his upcoming series, the fifth installment to the popular TVB drama series, File of Justice.

Chan's performance in this series about young, yuppie lawyers caught the attention of the HK audience, and TVB. She joined as a TVB actress and has since made other series, most notably Untraceable Evidence, playing the calm and collected forensics doctor, "Pauline Lip"; and in Healing Hands, a TVB series known for its cutting edge medical topics. In 2002, Chan won the coveted "Most Favourite TV Actress" award presented annually by TVB. Having already starred in various TVB dramas, she is no longer signed on with TVB as a full-time actress. In November 2006, Chan announced she would be returning to film a TVB serial in February 2007.

Filmography

TV series

Film

Discography
Flora Chan (2000)
自在 (2001)
愛得起 (2002)

References

External links
 
 

 	 

|-
! colspan="3" style="background: #DAA520;" | TVB Anniversary Awards

1970 births
Living people
Actresses from Massachusetts
American actresses of Chinese descent
Female models from Massachusetts
American television actresses
Hong Kong emigrants to the United States
Morrissey College of Arts & Sciences alumni
Actresses from Boston
TVB veteran actors
20th-century American actresses
21st-century American actresses
20th-century Hong Kong actresses
21st-century Hong Kong actresses
21st-century American singers
21st-century American women singers